Senecio amygdalifolius is a species of flowering plant in the daisy family (Asteraceae). It occurs in the Australian states of New South Wales and Queensland, in wet eucalyptus forest or around the margins of rainforest. Ferdinand von Mueller described it in 1859, from a collection made by Dr. Hermann Beckler, near the Hastings River.

References

amygdalifolius
Asterales of Australia
Flora of New South Wales
Flora of Queensland
Plants described in 1859
Taxa named by Ferdinand von Mueller